Peñas is a location in the La Paz Department in Bolivia.

References

Populated places in La Paz Department (Bolivia)